Turn (or Thurn) is a remote abandoned former settlement in the Municipality of Kočevje in southern Slovenia. The area is part of the traditional region of Lower Carniola and is now included in the Southeast Slovenia Statistical Region. Its territory is now part of the village of Knežja Lipa.

History
Turn was a village inhabited by Gottschee Germans. Before the Second World War it had four houses. In May 1942 the settlement was burned by Italian troops. It was not rebuilt after the war, and the pastures were incorporated into a collective farm.

References

External links
Turn on Geopedia
Pre–World War II list of oeconyms and family names in Turn

Former populated places in the Municipality of Kočevje